Pyzy ( singular: pyza) are a type of dumpling (kluski). The dish is most commonly referred to in its plural for pyzy, as it is most commonly served as a main course meal: large oval-shaped kluski, characteristic to Polish cuisine.

Potato pyzy

Potato pyzy are prepared from a raw or a mix of raw and boiled potatoes, optionally with added flour, eggs and salt, cooked in boiling water. Stuffed with meat, twaróg or mushroom stuffing, alternatively served without stuffing, and instead served with bacon, lard or fried onion.

Dishes prepared similar to potato pyzy include goły, kartacze and Silesian dumplings.

Leavened pyzy

Leavened pyzy or pyzy drożdżowe are prepared from flour, eggs, yeast, milk, butter, sugar and salt. These are cooked in boiling water or on steam (see pampuchy). In literature, pyzy are said to also be prepared by being baked in an oven.

See also
Cepelinai
Poutine râpée

External links
 10 Must-Have Foods from Polish Cities

References

Dumplings
Polish cuisine